The 2021 Shropshire Council election took place on 6 May 2021 as part of the 2021 United Kingdom local elections. All 74 councillors were elected from 63 electoral divisions which return either one, two or three councillors each by first-past-the-post voting for a four-year term of office.

Summary

Election result

|-

Though the Conservatives maintained their majority on the council, there was a major shock result that saw the incumbent Conservative leader of the council, Peter Nutting, lose his seat to a Liberal Democrat challenger. He was replaced as leader of the council by Conservative Lezley Picton at the AGM held later that month.

Council composition
Following the last election in 2017, the composition of the council was:

After the election, the composition of the council was:

I - Independent 
G - Green Party 
H - Health Concern

Ward results

Abbey

Albrighton

Alveley and Claverley

Bagley

Battlefield

Bayston Hill, Column & Sutton

Belle Vue

Bishop’s Castle

Bowbrook

Bridgnorth East & Astley Abbotts

Bridgnorth West and Tasley

Broseley

Brown Clee

Burnell

Castlefields and Ditherington

Cheswardine

Chirbury & Worthen

Church Stretton & Craven Arms

Clee

Cleobury Mortimer

Clun

Copthorne

Corvedale

Ellesmere Urban

Gobowen, Selattyn & Weston Rhyn

Harlescott

Highley

Hodnet

Karen Calder was previously elected as a Conservative.

Llanymynech

Longden

Loton

Ludlow East

Ludlow North

Ludlow South

Market Drayton East

Market Drayton West

David Minnery and Roger Hughes were previously elected as Conservatives.

Meole

Monkmoor

Much Wenlock

At the previous election, the Conservative candidate was elected unopposed.

Oswestry East

Oswestry South

Oswestry West

Porthill

Prees

Quarry and Coton Hill

Radbrook

Rea Valley

Ruyton & Baschurch

Severn Valley

Shawbury

Shifnal North

Shifnal South and Cosford

St Martin's

St Oswald

Sundorne

Tern

The Meres

Underdale

Wem

Whitchurch North

Whitchurch South

Whittington

Worfield

By-elections

Highley

Bridgnorth West and Tasley

References

Shropshire
Shropshire Council elections
21st century in Shropshire